Uguressapitiya is a village in Sri Lanka. It is located within Central Province. This is close to the second major city of Sri Lanka, Kandy.

See also
List of towns in Central Province, Sri Lanka

External links

Populated places in Kandy District